World Statesman is an Online Encyclopedia which provides reference material and specific information which includes historical chronologies for list of heads of state and government, formal positions of nation, religious organizations, nations, colonies and political entities of the world.

References 

Encyclopedias
Online research methods